Business Daily Africa, commonly known as Business Daily, is an English-language daily business newspaper published in Kenya. The newspaper is published by Nation Media Group from its headquarters at Nation Centre on Kimathi Street in Nairobi, Kenya.

See also

References

External links
Business Daily Website

Newspapers published in Kenya
Nation Media Group
Mass media in Nairobi